Glan-yr-Afon Halt railway station was a station to the southeast of Tylwch, Powys, Wales. The station was closed in 1962.

References

Further reading

Disused railway stations in Powys
Railway stations in Great Britain opened in 1928
Railway stations in Great Britain closed in 1962
Former Great Western Railway stations